Admiral Michael de Courcy (17?? – 22 February 1824), third son of John de Courcy, 18th Baron Kingsale, was an Anglo-Irish naval officer who served in the British Royal Navy.

In March 1809 de Courcy was sent to Rio de Janeiro to take over from Rear-Admiral Sir William Sidney Smith as commander of the South America Station. Sidney Smith was not aware of his recall, and although de Courcy arrived on 2 May, it was only by 18 May that
de Courcy assumed command with the help of Lord Strangford, the British Envoy Extraordinary and Minister Plenipotentiary to Portugal.

References

1824 deaths
Royal Navy vice admirals
Year of birth uncertain
Younger sons of barons